Tsepelovo is a village in the Zagori region (Epirus region). It stands at a height of 1,200 meters in a panoramic location on the mountain range of Tymfi. It is the biggest of the 45 villages of Zagori and it was the seat of Tymfi municipality. Its name is of Slavic origin. It lies in the middle of the Vikos–Aoös National Park, 48 km from Ioannina.

Nearest places

Skamneli, east (distance: 4 km)
Vradeto, west (distance: 7 km)

Population

History 
Founded in the 16th century, Tsepelovo became from the 18th century onwards the administrative center of Zagori. It remained relatively prosperous until the end of the Ottoman occupation (1912). The village was a local trade center, and remains so especially because of the trade of timber. In 1820, before the outbreak of the Greek Revolution and the defeat of Ali Pasha, the poet Ioannis Vilaras and the famous Epirote scholar Athanasios Psalidas came from Ioannina to prepare the people for the great national revolt. Psalidas also taught for 2 years at the local school.

The traditional stone architecture is visible in every building, in the village paths, dwellings and churches. The historical church of Agios Nikolaos was renovated at 1753 and decorated with unique wall paintings by exceptional painters of nearby Kapesovo.

Two kilometers out of the village, in the Vikaki (Greek: small Vikos) canyon lies the monastery of St John Rogovou. It was founded at 1028 by the sister of Emperor Romanos III Argyros of Byzantium. It was rebuilt in 1749, possibly after it was damaged by fire, and the frescoes were painted by iconographers from Kapesovo. Neofytos Doukas wanted to establish there the Higher School of Epirus, a high level educational institution. Because of the outbreak of the Greek War of Independence and the military conflicts the idea could not become reality.

The village has historically also been settled by Christian Orthodox Albanians, who largely came after the 15th century, later assimilating into the local population. Sarakatsani have settled at the beginning of the 20th century.

The people of Tsepelovo used to emigrate within Greece to Macedonia, Thrace and to areas of southern Greece. Outside Greece, they mainly migrated to Asia Minor and the U.S.

Today, the village is a popular destination for tourists during the winter season.

Notable people
Konstantinos Rados, merchant and member of Filiki Eteria.
Dimitrios Kotopoulis, actor.
Marika Kotopouli (1887–1954), actress.
Dimitrios Myrat, actor.

Gallery

See also
Zagori
Vikos–Aoös National Park

References

Bibliography

External links
Official website of Tsepelovo 
Prefecture of Ioannina. Tourist department of Greece

Populated places in Ioannina (regional unit)